was a justice of the Supreme Court of Japan.

References

Supreme Court of Japan justices
1936 births
2015 deaths